Shimmy  is a fitness television series broadcast in Canada on ONE: The Mind and Body Channel that emphasizes the health benefits of belly dance.  The twenty-six episode series was designed by and created by Kim Pechet, a belly dance instructor and fitness professional.   An original Canadian production, Shimmy premiered October 1, 2007 on ACCESS and CLT in Canada as well as in the United States on Discovery Health and OWN.  Shimmy has been broadcast throughout Central and South America, Germany, and India  as well as in Canada and the United States.

Episode Structure 
Each episode begins with a warm up to increase flexibility and to prepare the body for the teaching section. In the teaching section, each episode leads viewers through four to six belly dance movements. The repeated motions are designed to tone hips, thighs, glutes, and abdominals through traditional Middle-Eastern belly-dance movements. In the performance section, dancers in full costume combine the movements just taught into a low-impact choreography designed to burn calories. The episode ends with a display of freestyle belly dance from the dancers.

Episode List

Season 1

Episode 1: Hips, Hops and a Shimmy

Dance Level: Beginner

Fitness Category: Calorie-Burner

Target Zones: Hips and Thighs

The Shimmy Dancers lead you through a series of fundamental belly dance moves like the ‘Shoulder Shimmy’ and ‘Hip Rotations’ making this a perfect episode for beginners, or those wanting to go back to basics. 
Moves taught in this episode: Shoulder Shimmy, Hip Rotation, 1, 2, 3 Hop, Hip Pop, Head Slide

Episode 2: Cairo to Istanbul

Dance Level: Beginner- Intermediate

Fitness Category: Stretch and Strengthen

Target Zones: Hips and Glutes

Nothing says middle-eastern dance like the classic ‘Head Slide’: the variations we teach will give any dance routine an exotic flavour as voluptuous Gillian leads us through the sensual ‘Turkish Figure-Eight’. 
Moves taught in this episode: Head Slide, Basic Egyptian Step, Hip Circles, Turkish Figure-Eight

Episode 3: Sharp and Sexy with a Shimmy

Dance Level: Beginner-Intermediate

Fitness Category: Tighten and Tone

Target Zones:  Arms and Hips

Moves taught in this episode like ‘Expressive Hand Gestures’ give performances from even beginning dancers an authentic feel, while moves like the ‘Three-Quarter Shimmy’ will show your technical skills. 
Moves taught in this episode: Hip-piston, Snake Arms, Expressive Hand Gestures, Three-Quarter Shimmy

Episode 4: The Hippy Camel

Dance Level: Beginner

Fitness Category: Tighten and Tone

Target Zones: Back and Glutes

The ‘Chest Camel’ and ‘Shoulder Rolls’ are sensual and fluid dance moves that also help increase strength and flexibility in these neglected areas. Adding on ‘M and M’s’ and a vigorous ‘Village Shimmy’, the Shimmy Dancers lead you through a perfect lunchtime office workout. 
Moves Taught in This Episode: Shoulder Rolls, Village Shimmy, M and M's, Chest Camel

Episode 5: From Camp to Cabaret

Dance Level: Beginner

Fitness Category: Calorie-Burner

Target Zones: Thighs and Arms

Undoubtedly, the Shimmy Dancers’ favourite combination in the series was the ‘Three Step Turn’ and ‘Hip Bounce’. Dance along with us and you'll know why we love this fun and flirty combination. 
Moves Taught in this Episode: Three Step Turn, Hip Bounce, Ghawazee Step, Cabaret Shimmy, Side Step Arm Sweep

Episode 6: The Sultan's Chest

Dance Level: Beginner-Intermediate

Fitness Category: Tighten and Tone

Target Zones: Back and Glutes

If typing away at a computer has got your upper back stiff, ‘Chest Circle’ and ‘Liquid Arms’ will not only ease the pain, but prevent future aches by strengthening those neglected muscles, and they are damn sexy to boot!
Moves taught in this episode: Step Touch Step, Egyptian Figure-Eight, Turkish Bump, Chest Circles, Liquid Arms

Episode 7: The Hanging Garden

Dance Level: Beginner

Fitness Category: Tighten and Tone

Target Zones: Thighs and Belly

The Shimmy Dancers display a variety of traditional and cabaret upper arm and hand movements like ‘Falling Leaves’ and  how a basic travelling step like the ‘Grapevine’ and the ballet-inspired ‘Ronde de Jambe’ take on a sensual middle-eastern flavour simply by emphasizing the hip. 
Moves taught in this episode: Grapevine, Falling Leaves, Head Slide, Ronde de Jambe, Hip Circle

Episode 8: Shimmies and Turns

Dance Level: Intermediate-Advanced

Fitness Category: Calorie-Burner

Target Zones: Glutes and Thighs

In this episode we practice moves like the ‘Cut Turn’ and a quick spin on the ‘Sa’idi Step’ to enable you to engage the audience members all around you. 
Moves Taught in This Episode: Shoulder Shimmy, Shimmy Layered Hip Circle, Cut Turn, Sa’idi Step, Hip Rotation, Tremor Layered Figure-Eight

Episode 9: Hips and Hops on a Snake

Dance Level: Beginner

Fitness Category: Calorie-Burner

Target Zone: Glutes and Arms

The teaching section is excellent for those interested in tribal belly dance as we combine the sharp ‘Hip Piston’ with ‘Snake Arms’—a classic combo in tribal style.
Moves Taught in This Episode: Hip Piston, Hip Pop, 1,2,3 Hop, Snake Arms

Episode 10: Hips Galore

Dance Level: Beginner - Intermediate

Fitness Category: Calorie-Burner

Target Zones: Thighs and Glutes

In this episode highlights correct positioning and movement of the hips with moves like the playful ‘Hip Bounce,’ ‘Maya Hips,’ and the ultra-sexy ‘Egyptian Figure-Eight.’ 
Moves Taught in This Episode: Three Step Turn, Hip Bounce, Maya Hips, Egyptian Figure-Eight

Episode 11: Salome and the Sultan

Dance Level: Beginner - Intermediate

Fitness Category: Tighten and Tone

Target Zones: Glutes, Hips and Thighs

The moves from the teaching section represent some of the best-loved Middle-Eastern dance moves like the ‘Head Slide’ and the ‘Hip Circle’ while mastering the ‘Egyptian Figure-Eight’ and the ‘Turkish Bump,’ will make you a truly international dancer. 
Moves Taught in this Episode: Head Slide, Hip Circle, Egyptian Figure Eight, Turkish Bump

Episode 12: Bellies in Beirut

Dance Level: Intermediate-Advanced

Fitness Category: Tighten and Tone

Target Zones: Belly and Back

From the ‘Village Shimmy’, to the ‘Lebanese hip-Circle’, to ‘Zar head’, moves taken from Middle Eastern folk dances give this episode a particularly authentic feel while ‘Shoulder Rolls’ add sensuality. 
Moves Taught in this Episode: Shoulder Rolls, Village Shimmy, Lebanese Hip-Circle, Zar Head, Belly Roll

Episode 13: Ottoman Nights

Dance Level: Advanced

Fitness Category: Calorie-Burner

Target Zones: Glutes and Thighs

In this episode we take the basics to a new level, adding variations, to create the most challenging moves in the whole series: the ‘Tremor Layered Figure-Eight’ and the ‘Shimmy Layered Hip Circle’. 
Moves Taught in this Episode: Basic Egyptian Step, Turkish Figure-Eight, Shimmy Layered Hip Circle, Tremor Layered Figure-Eight, Sa’idi Step

Season 2

14, "Shimmying Circles" - This episode begins with a gentle floor and standing warm-up. The teaching sequence covers moves such as the sensual ‘frontal chest circles’ and ‘liquid arms’, the flirty ‘shoulder shimmy’ and two variations of hip isolations: the ‘hip rotation’ and the ‘cut turn’. The performance combines these moves in a fluid choreography and inspiring freestyle belly dance finale.
15, "Camel in the Cabaret" - This episode begins with a relaxing warm-up that prepares the body to dance. Five core moves are showcased in the teaching sequence: the ‘gawazzi step’, ‘m and m’s’, the ‘cabaret shimmy’, the ‘chest-camel’, and the beautiful ‘side-step arm-sweep’. The choreography section provides the viewers an opportunity to practice these moves in sequence. The finale is a lively display of freestyle belly dance.
16, "Hops through Flames" - This episode begins with a gentle combination of stretches and warm-up exercises.  The teaching sequence demonstrates the sensual ‘flame’ and ‘ripple’ and the energetic ‘1,2,3 hop’ and ‘hip pop’. For the performance, viewers display these moves in an authentic belly dance choreography. The finale of the episode is a gorgeous display of freestyle belly dance.
17,  "Slides, Turns and Layers" - This episode begins with a combination of gentle warm-up moves. In the teaching sequence the viewers practice ‘head-slides’, ‘hip-circles’, and the more challenging ‘shimmy-layered hip-circles’, ‘tremor figure-eights’ and ‘sa’idi turns’. The combined moves are demonstrated in the choreography section and showcased in a beautiful freestyle belly dance finale.
18, "The Camel's Garden" - This episode guides viewers through a gentle warm-up introduction. The teaching sequence introduces the traveling step ‘grapevine’ and the elegant ‘falling leaves’. Familiar moves such as the ‘hip-down ronde-de-jambe’, the ‘m and m’s’ and the beautiful ‘chest camel’ are also practiced.
Viewers showcase these moves in a fun and energetic choreography and then close with a mesmerizing freestyle belly dance.

19, "Turns with a Bounce" - This episode begins with a gentle warm-up of stretches that prepares the body to dance. The teaching sequence includes the ‘three-step turn’, ‘hip-bounce’, expressive ‘facial gestures’, and the challenging ‘three-quarter shimmy’. The performance sequence combines these moves into an exhilarating choreography. The episode concludes with a freestyle belly dance.
20, "The Camel and the Snake" - This episode begins with a gentle but thorough warm up that prepares the body to dance. 
In the teaching sequence, viewers practice the ‘chest camel’ and the ‘ripple’ which are then combined with the sultry ‘full camel.’ ‘Hip pistons’ and ‘snake arms’ are added to create an authentic belly dance choreography. A freestyle finale concludes the episode.

21, "Ethnic Fluidity" - This episode prepares the viewers to dance with a gentle warm-up. The teaching sequence includes: ‘chest-circles’, ‘liquid-arms’, ‘shoulder-rolls’, and the energetic ‘village-shimmy’. Viewers are given the opportunity to use what they have practiced in a choreographed belly dance performance. Finally, inspiration transforms these moves into a freestyle belly dance finale.
22, "Turkish Delight" - This episode begins with a relaxing warm-up that prepares the body to dance. The teaching sequence demonstrates three hip moves: the ‘basic Egyptian step’, the ‘Turkish figure eight’ and ‘m and m’s’ and the sensual upper body move: the ‘chest camel’. The episode concludes with a beautiful dance choreography and inspiring freestyle belly dance.
23, "Rippling" - This episode begins with a combination of warm-up moves to prepare the body to dance.
The teaching sequence includes the ‘chest camel’, the ‘ripple’, the sultry ‘full camel’, the traveling step ‘grapevine’, as well as the elegant ‘falling leaves’ and ‘hip-down ronde de jambe’. These movements then take shape in a fun and energetic choreography. Closing is a transformation of these moves into a freestyle belly dance.

24, "Down the Nile" - This episode begins with seated and standing warm-up moves. The teaching sequence breaks down and demonstrates five authentic belly dance moves: the hip isolations ‘maya hips’ and its reverse, the ‘Egyptian figure-eight’, the ‘cabaret shimmy’, the ‘gawazzi step’, and the ‘side-step arm-sweep’. . The performance sequence combines these moves into a lively and fun belly dance choreography. The finale is a mesmerizing display of freestyle belly dance.
25, "Slithering Circles" - This episode begins with a gentle combination of stretches and warm-up exercises. The teaching sequence practices key belly dance moves such as ‘Hip Piston’ and ‘Snake Arms’ as well as the more challenging ‘Belly Rolls,’ ‘Lebanese Hip Circles, and the ‘Zar Head’. The combined moves are demonstrated in the choreography section and showcased in a beautiful freestyle belly dance finale.
26, "Bumps" - This episode begins with a gentle combination of movements in preparation for dancing. The teaching sequence leads the viewers through the energetic ‘1,2,3 Hop’ and ‘Hip Pop’, the ‘Turkish Bump’, and the ‘Egyptian Figure Eight’. The finale guides the viewers through an exciting choreography of what they've just learned and concludes with stunning freestyle belly dance.

Awards 
Shimmy won the 2008 Leo Award for Best Cinematography for an Information or Lifestyle Series for the Episode "Slithering and Circling". The show was also nominated for Best Information or Lifestyle Series and Best Direction in an Information or Lifestyle Series.

References

External links 

 

2007 Canadian television series debuts
Dance television shows
2000s Canadian sports television series